A gulet is a traditional design of a two-masted or three-masted wooden sailing vessel (the most common design has two masts) from the southwestern coast of Turkey, particularly built in the coastal towns of Bodrum and Marmaris; although similar vessels can be found all around the eastern Mediterranean. Today, this type of vessel, varying in size from 14 to 35 metres, is popular for tourist charters. For considerations of crew economy, diesel power is now almost universally used and many are not properly rigged for sailing.

History 
There are differing opinions about the history and etymology of gullet which took the Turkish name "gulet" from the Italian word goletta. There is still controversy on whether it originated from the schooner, which has long been used as a sweeping net, trawl net or sponging vessel in Turkey in the Aegean and Mediterranean shores, and as a freight vessel in the Black Sea; or it originates from the fishing vessel guletta (gouëlette or goélette in French), that has come up with the evolution of the word galea or galeotta for the old Italian naval vessels or "goleta" in Spanish. Others have argued that it resembles the American gullet used in line fishing in the Greenland banks, or the clippers carrying goods from India or Australia to England in the periods of colonization.

The origin of the Bodrum type schooner vessels falls to a nearby date, to the beginning of the 1970s. These types of vessels have come up as a result of the need to carry tourists, who have come in numbers to the Aegean region and especially to Bodrum and Marmaris at the end of the 1960s, to nearby bays. The first samples of the vessels called the Bodrum gulet are seen in those years with the addition to meet that demand of chambers and seating on the back of the deck to the chamberless gulet used in fishing or sponging till those years.

In the tourism industry, gulets offer guests air conditioning, bathrooms and storage space for luggage.

Etymology
The Turkish word gulet is a loanword from Venetian gołéta (Italian goletta), itself a loanword from French gouëlette (present-day spelling goélette), meaning "schooner". The French word is probably related to goéland, meaning (and etymologically related to the word) "gull", ultimately of Celtic origin.

Boat construction in Bodrum
The boat construction in Bodrum is not a process that started solely with the construction of Gulet. A long construction process has been there starting from antiquity times to the Ottoman times (although with certain interruptions) due to the geographic and historical position of the place. The insufficiency of war hardware such as cannons and shells for the war vessels built in Istanbul within the structure of the main docks opened the search for new production facilities in the second half of the 18th century. New shipyards were constructed in various regions at the turn of the 19th century. In the shipyard in Bodrum, along with those in settlements like Sinop, Gemlik, Rodos, Fatsa and Amasra, galleon construction was started in the beginning of the 19th century.

Galleon construction in Bodrum was interrupted in the middle of 19th century, however boat construction continued for use in fishing, sponging, and especially commerce with the islands (till the years 1935–1936). Construction of Bodrum-type Gulet started to meet the demand in parallel to the development of tourism in the beginning of the 1970s. This development caused the growth of the boat construction sector, particularly for the successful schooner examples made by the local boat masters, which increased the interest in such types of boats.

Bodrum type schooner
As the schooner construction methods in Bodrum are observed, it is seen that the basic construction approach has not generally been subject to great change. Other than the use of electrical equipment, laminated materials, high power engines and similar high technology products, the schooner construction starts with the construction of the iron spine and continues with the use of traditional weights. The only dimension that changed in the weight usage is the use of heavy metals in the vessels constructed with high quality using high technology instead of stone used as ballast in the traditional method. Although the essence of the weight changes, the spine still filled in with the traditional method form the basis of both the balance of the vessel and the construction of the ribs, frame and curves.

In schooner construction, the frames are placed from the head to the end, the board form is created with the measure of the eye, the side coatings are handmade and the shell is finished. The finishing of the shell is one of the most important stages where the tradition is kept for both the traditional/local boat masters who do the construction without a plan and almost all of whom have learned from the famous master Ziya Guvendiren of Bodrum as well as the constructors who produce according to international standards like RINA or Lloyd's Register. With the finishing of the shell, the construction of the deck and the chambers is completed after the celebrations that symbolize the “seamanship” of the wood.

The schooner, the construction of which takes 9 to 12 months according to the method employed, is launched to the sea over skids oiled with melted suet. The schooners constructed in shipyards away from the sea, sledged through narrow straits with the help of skids and brought to the shore make up scenes that in turn make Bodrum matchless.

The Bodrum schooner that is pulled on land for maintenance each year continue sailing in the Aegean and Mediterranean seas with its aesthetic silhouette gained with its large back deck, spacious chamber design and low board.

The preliminary doubts on the seaworthiness of the Bodrum schooner and the claims that it is a vessel type “bulky, unable to speed, not suitable for setting sails” and “traveling only with the engine power” have disappeared with the boats that are built in the last 20 years and have proven themselves in the Bodrum Cup Wooden Yachts Races. The investment approach to boat construction has changed in time, construction of other types of boats other than Gulet have started and this sector specialized from boat design, materials, construction techniques and construction teams have turned into one of the most important economic sectors in Bodrum.

Canadian Motorized Goélettes
The basic hull form has been used in the Province of Quebec, Canada for powered wooden goélettes that have been employed in the coastal freight trade. In his 1974 book The Lower St. Lawrence, the historian Ivan S. Brookes included illustrations of motorized wooden goélettes that he photographed on the St. Lawrence River. These included the Riv. Verte at Baie Comeau in 1955; Eric G at La Malbaie Wharf, Murray Bay; the Orleans underway in the Saguenay River; the Rose Helene loading pulpwood at Rivière du Loup, and old goélettes that had been retired from service and abandoned at St. Louis, Ile aux Coudres. Canadian goélettes generally have had the wheelhouse and engine far aft, although the Orleans, evidently a newer vessel, had them located amidships.

A somewhat similar type of small freighter, also wooden but steam powered, and with wheelhouse and engine placed far aft, was built for service on the Great Lakes during the lumber era. Cargoes included lumber, shingles, lath, salt, stone, coal and pig iron. Lake sailors called them "rabbits". Typical examples included the D.F. Rose of 1868, the Charles. Rietz of 1872, the City of Mt. Clemens of 1884 and the Minnie E. Kelton of 1894. Apparently the last survivor of the type was the steamer M. Sicken, built in 1884 at Marine City, Michigan and sold for scrapping in 1937.

The steel fishing trawler Goelette (IMO 7359747) was built in 1974 by Ateliers et Chantiers du Havre at Le Havre, France for service in the South Atlantic. Registered in Namibia, as of 2022 this 690-ton, 164-foot vessel is owned by Gendor Fishing of Walvis Bay, Namibia with Lüderitz as its home port.

See also
 The Blue Voyage
 The Turquoise Coast
 Marinas in Turkey
 Tourism in Turkey

References

 Osman Kademoglu; Denizlerin Guzelleri; Duran Kitap, Istanbul 2000
 Avram Galanti Bodrumlu; Bodrum Tarihi; BOSAV Yay. Ankara 1996: 78-79

External links

Sailboat types
Maritime industries in Turkey